The Ismaninger Straße is a city center, entrance and exit road in Munich.

Route 

The road continues straight to the north along the Innere Wiener Straße at the Max-Weber-Platz in Haidhausen, crosses the Prinzregentenstraße at the city district border between the districts of Au-Haidhausen and Bogenhausen, and continues east on the eastern Isarhochufer of the old town of Bogenhausen at the traditional restaurant Bogenhauser Hof (No. 85) and further on the former noble seat Steppberg (later Villa Fleischer, completed after the First World War as Reichsfinanzhof, (now Bundesfinanzhof) over to the Herkomerplatz fort, where it comes from the Isar bridge Max-Joseph-Brücke to meet Montgelasstraße, which is extended from Bülowstraße to Effnerplatz. The extension of the Ismaninger Straße forms the Oberföhringer Straße, which continues on the high bank through the Bogenhausen district Oberföhring, the community Unterföhring and further in the direction of Ismaning.

The tram line 17 runs through the street (until the timetable change of Line 16 in December 2017). At Max-Weber-Platz it crosses several other tram lines. Under the Max-Weber-Platz is the same named metro station with branches of the U4 and U5 subway lines.

Designation 
The street is named after the municipality of Ismaning, the capital of the same named county, which did not belong to Bavaria until 1802, but to the Hochstift Freising. The name of the street dates back to 1856.

Historical architectural monuments in Ismaninger Straße 

 No. 1 Tenement house, late 19th C.
 No. 2, 4 semi-detached house, Art Nouveau, around 1900, with bay window
 No. 3 Tenement house, Neo-Renaissance, with bay Window, Late 19th C.
 No. 5 Suburban house, Late Classicist Corner construction, Mid-19th C.
 No. 11 Tenement house, around 1860/70
 No. 22 administrative wing of the hospital, 1892/93 by Wilhelm Rettig
 No. 27 Neo-Baroque Villa, 1899, redesigned in 1954
 No. 29 Richard Strauss Conservatory, late 19th century, redesigned
 No. 50 Tenement house, Neo-Baroque, 1899
 No. 52 Tenement house, 1892 by Korbinian Schmid, group with Prinzregentenstraße 67
 No. 56 Tenement house, Late Classicist, around 1870
 No. 58/60 block of two small raw brick houses, 1881
 No. 62a Tenement, Neo-Baroque, around 1900, group with Geibelstraße 1
 No. 65 villa-like Neo-Baroque construction with high Belvedere, 1903
 No. 65a villa-style corner house in German Renaissance style, 1896 by Alfons Hering as a separate residential building
 No. 67a Villa, Neo-Baroque, 1903, by Josef Wölker
 No. 68 Tenement house with entrance tower, 1899
 No. 69 Villa-like Baroque construction, early 20th C.
 No. 74 Tenement, Neo-Baroque, early 20th century
 No. 75 Tenement house, German Renaissance style, with an entrance tower, around 1900
 No. 82 Tenement house, around 1900
 No. 84 Tenement house, Baroque style Art Nouveau, around 1900
 No. 85 Gaststätte Bogenhauser Hof, Detached suburban house, Late Classicist, with richly curved south gable, around 1850
 No. 86 Tenement house, Art Nouveau, around 1900
 No. 88 Tenement house, German Renaissance, around 1900
 No. 91 Tenement house, German Renaissance, around 1900
 No. 92 Tenement house, Neo-Baroque, 1898 by Leonhard Romeis
 No. 94/96 Group of Tenement houses, Baroque Art Nouveau, early 20th C.
 No. 95 castle-like Neo-Baroque villa (so-called Bürgermeistervilla), 1898 by Paul Pfann and Günther Blumentritt
 No. 98 Tenement house, corner construction in Baroque Art Nouveau style, 1910
 No. 102/106 handsome semi-detached house in late Baroque Art Nouveau style, 1910/11 by Oswald Schiller
 No. 105 Togal-Werk, 1899/1900 by Paul Pfann
 No. 109 castle-like, Neo-Baroque monumental building (now Bundesfinanzhof)
 No. 111/113/115 Baroque residential group, 1922/23
 No. 122 Tenement house, Neo-Renaissance, 1889 by Michael Reifenstuel, added on in 1901
 No. 124 Tenement house, German Renaissance, around 1900, with large group of Michaels (renewed)
 No. 126 Tenement house, German Renaissance, 1901 by Benedikt Beggel
 No. 152/154/156/158 Residential group which leads around the corner to the Pixisstraße, 1927 by Heilmann & Littmann for the non-profit Wohnbaugesellschaft München-Ost (housing association )

References 

Streets in Munich
Buildings and structures in Munich
Historicist architecture in Munich